Public choice, or public choice theory, is "the use of economic tools to deal with traditional problems of political science". Its content includes the study of political behavior. In political science, it is the subset of positive political theory that studies self-interested agents (voters, politicians, bureaucrats) and their interactions, which can be represented in a number of ways – using (for example) standard constrained utility maximization, game theory, or decision theory. It is the origin and intellectual foundation of contemporary work in political economy.

In popular use, "public choice" is often used as a shorthand for components of modern public choice theory that focus on the ways in which elected officials, bureaucrats and other government agents can be influenced by their own perceived self-interest when making decisions in their official roles. Economist James M. Buchanan received the 1986 Nobel Memorial Prize in Economic Sciences "for his development of the contractual and constitutional bases for the theory of economic and political decision-making" in this space.

Public choice analysis has roots in positive analysis ("what is") but is often used for normative purposes ("what ought to be") in order to identify a problem or to suggest improvements to constitutional rules (i.e., constitutional economics).

Public choice theory is also closely related to social choice theory, a mathematical approach to aggregation of individual interests, welfares, or votes. Much early work had aspects of both, and both fields use the tools of economics and game theory. Since voter behavior influences the behavior of public officials, public-choice theory often uses results from social-choice theory. General treatments of public choice may also be classified under public economics.

Public choice, building upon economic theory, has some core tenets that are largely adhered to. The first is the use of the individual as the common decision unit. Due to this there is no decision made by an aggregate whole. Rather, decisions are made by the combined choices of the individuals. The second is the use of markets in the political system, which was argued to be a return to true economics. The final is the self-interested nature of all individuals within the political system. However, as Buchanan and Tullock argued, "the ultimate defense of the economic-individualist behavioral assumption must be empirical...The only final test of a model lies in its ability to assist in understanding real phenomena".

Background and development

History of social choice and public choice theory 

An early precursor of modern public choice theory was the work of Swedish economist Knut Wicksell (1896), which treated government as political exchange, a quid pro quo, in formulating a benefit principle linking taxes and expenditures. American statesman and political theorist John C. Calhoun is also seen as a precursor to modern public choice theory. His writings on political economy anticipate the "public choice revolution" in modern economics and political science.

Some subsequent economic analysis has been described as treating government as though it attempted "to maximize some kind sort of welfare function for society" and as distinct from characterizations of self-interested economic agents, such as those in business. This is a clear dichotomy, as one can be self-interested in one area, while being altruistic in another. In contrast, public choice theory modeled government as made up of officials who, besides pursuing the public interest, might act to benefit themselves, for example in the budget-maximizing model of bureaucracy, possibly at the cost of efficiency.

Modern public choice theory 
Modern public-choice theory, and especially election theory, has been dated from the work of Duncan Black, sometimes called "the founding father of public choice". In a series of papers from 1948, which culminated in The Theory of Committees and Elections (1958), and later, Black outlined a program of unification toward a more general "Theory of Economic and Political Choices" based on common formal methods, developed underlying concepts of what would become median voter theory, and rediscovered earlier works on voting theory. Black's work also included the possibility of entirely random outcomes in a voting structure, where the only governance over the outcome is the where a particular motion falls in the sequence presented.

Kenneth J. Arrow's Social Choice and Individual Values (1951) influenced formulation of the theory of public choice and election theory. Building on Black's theory, Arrow concluded that in a non-dictatorial setting, there was no predictable outcome or preference order that can be discerned for a set of possible distributions. Among other important works are Anthony Downs (1957)  An Economic Theory of Democracy and Mancur Olson (1965) The Logic of Collective Action. The Logic of Collective Action was fundamental in beginning the study of special interests. In it, Olson began to open questions about the nature of groups, including their lack of incentive to act with a lack of organization and free-rider problems of these larger groups upon specialized group's actions. Due to the incentive for concentrated groups (such as farmers) to act for their own interest, paired with a lack of organization of large groups (such as the public as a whole), legislation implemented as a result benefits a small group rather than the public at large.

James M. Buchanan and Gordon Tullock coauthored The Calculus of Consent: Logical Foundations of Constitutional Democracy (1962), considered one of the landmarks in public choice and constitutional economics. In particular, the preface describes the book as "about the political organization" of a free society. But its methodology, conceptual apparatus, and analytics "are derived, essentially, from the discipline that has as its subject the economic organization of such a society" (1962, p. v). Buchanan and Tullock build out a framework within Calculus of constitutional decision making and structures. This framework differentiates decisions that are made into two categories: Constitutional decisions and political decisions. Constitutional decisions establish long standing rules that rarely change and govern the political structure itself. Political decisions are those that take place within and are governed by the structure. The book also focuses on positive-economic analysis as to the development of constitutional democracy but in an ethical context of consent. The consent takes the form of a compensation principle like Pareto efficiency for making a policy change and unanimity or at least no opposition as a point of departure for social choice.

Somewhat later, the probabilistic voting theory started to displace the median voter theory in showing how to find Nash equilibria in multidimensional space. The theory was later formalized further by Peter Coughlin.

Constitutional economics 
Constitutional economics is a research program in economics and constitutionalism that has been described as extending beyond the definition of "the economic analysis of constitutional law" in explaining the choice "of alternative sets of legal-institutional-constitutional rules that constrain the choices and activities of economic and political agents." This is distinct from explaining the choices of economic and political agents within those rules, a subject of "orthodox" economics.

Constitutional economics studies the "compatibility of effective economic decisions with the existing constitutional framework and the limitations or the favorable conditions created by that framework," It has been characterized as a practical approach to apply of the tools of economics to constitutional matters. For example, a major concern of every nation is the proper allocation of available national economic and financial resources. The legal solution to this problem falls within the scope of constitutional economics.

Constitutional economics takes into account the significant impacts of political economic decisions as opposed to limiting analysis to economic relationships as functions of the dynamics of distribution of "marketable" goods and services. "The political economist who seeks to offer normative advice, must, of necessity, concentrate on the process or structure within which political decisions are observed to be made. Existing constitutions, or structures or rules, are the subject of critical scrutiny. "

Decision-making processes and the state
One way to organize the subject matter studied by public choice theorists is to begin with the foundations of the state itself. According to this procedure, the most fundamental subject is the origin of government. Although some work has been done on anarchy, autocracy, revolution, and even war, the bulk of the study in this area has concerned the fundamental problem of collectively choosing constitutional rules. Much of this study on constitutional rules is based on work by James M. Buchanan. This work assumes a group of individuals who aim to form a government, then it focuses on the problem of hiring the agents required to carry out government functions agreed upon by the members.

Bureaucracy
Another major sub-field is the study of bureaucracy. The usual model depicts the top bureaucrats as being chosen by the chief executive and legislature, depending on whether the democratic system is presidential or parliamentary. The typical image of a bureau chief is a person on a fixed salary who is concerned with pleasing those who appointed him or her. The latter has the power to hire and fire him or her more or less at will. The bulk of the bureaucrats, however, are civil servants whose jobs and pay are protected by a civil service system against major changes by their appointed bureau chiefs. This image is often compared with that of a business owner whose profit varies with the success of production and sales, who aims to maximize profit, and who can in an ideal system hire and fire employees at will. William Niskanen is generally considered the founder of public choice literature on the bureaucracy.

"Expressive interests" and democratic irrationality
Geoffrey Brennan and Loren Lomasky claim that democratic policy is biased to favor "expressive interests" and neglect practical and utilitarian considerations. Brennan and Lomasky differentiate between instrumental interests (any kind of practical benefit, both monetary and non-monetary) and expressive interests (forms of expression like applause). According to Brennan and Lomasky, the paradox of voting can be resolved by differentiating between expressive and instrumental interests.

This argument has led some public choice scholars to claim that politics is plagued by irrationality. In articles published in the Econ Journal Watch, economist Bryan Caplan contended that voter choices and government economic decisions are inherently irrational. Caplan's ideas are more fully developed in his book The Myth of the Rational Voter (Princeton University Press 2007). Countering Donald Wittman's arguments in The Myth of Democratic Failure, Caplan claims that politics is biased in favor of irrational beliefs.

According to Caplan, democracy effectively subsidizes irrational beliefs. Anyone who derives utility from potentially irrational policies like protectionism can receive private benefits while imposing the costs of such beliefs on the general public. Were people to bear the full costs of their "irrational beliefs", they would lobby for them optimally, taking into account both their instrumental consequences and their expressive appeal. Instead, democracy oversupplies policies based on irrational beliefs. Caplan defines rationality mainly in terms of mainstream price theory, pointing out that mainstream economists tend to oppose protectionism and government regulation more than the general population, and that more educated people are closer to economists on this score, even after controlling for confounding factors such as income, wealth or political affiliation. One criticism is that many economists do not share Caplan's views on the nature of public choice. However, Caplan does have data to support his position. Economists have, in fact, often been frustrated by public opposition to economic reasoning. As Sam Peltzman puts it: Economists know what steps would improve the efficiency of HSE [health, safety, and environmental] regulation, and they have not been bashful advocates of them. These steps include substituting markets in property rights, such as emission rights, for command and control ... The real problem lies deeper than any lack of reform proposals or failure to press them. It is our inability to understand their lack of political appeal.Public choice's application to government regulation was developed by George Stigler (1971) and Sam Peltzman (1976).

Special interests
Public choice theory is often used to explain how political decision-making results in outcomes that conflict with the preferences of the general public. For example, many advocacy group and pork barrel projects are not the desire of the overall democracy. However, it makes sense for politicians to support these projects. It may make them feel powerful and important. It can also benefit them financially by opening the door to future wealth as lobbyists. The project may be of interest to the politician's local constituency, increasing district votes or campaign contributions. The politician pays little or no cost to gain these benefits, as he is spending public money. Special-interest lobbyists are also behaving rationally. They can gain government favors worth millions or billions for relatively small investments. They face a risk of losing out to their competitors if they don't seek these favors. The taxpayer is also behaving rationally. The cost of defeating any one government give-away is very high, while the benefits to the individual taxpayer are very small. Each citizen pays only a few pennies or a few dollars for any given government favor, while the costs of ending that favor would be many times higher.

Everyone involved has rational incentives to do exactly what they are doing, even though the desire of the general constituency is opposite. Costs are diffused, while benefits are concentrated. The voices of vocal minorities with much to gain are heard over those of indifferent majorities with little to individually lose. However the notion that groups with concentrated interests will dominate politics is incomplete because it is only one half of political equilibrium. Something must incite those preyed upon to resist even the best organized concentrated interests. In his article on interest groups Gary Becker identified this countervailing force as being the deadweight loss from predation. His views capped what has come to be known as the Chicago school of political economy and it has come in sharp conflict with the so-called Virginia faction of public choice due to the former's assertion that politics will tend towards efficiency due to nonlinear deadweight losses and due to its claim that political efficiency renders policy advice irrelevant.

While good government tends to be a pure public good for the mass of voters, there may be many advocacy groups that have strong incentives for lobbying the government to implement specific policies that would benefit them, potentially at the expense of the general public. For example, lobbying by the sugar manufacturers might result in an inefficient subsidy for the production of sugar, either directly or by protectionist measures. The costs of such inefficient policies are dispersed over all citizens, and therefore unnoticeable to each individual. On the other hand, the benefits are shared by a small special-interest group with a strong incentive to perpetuate the policy by further lobbying. Due to rational ignorance, the vast majority of voters will be unaware of the effort; in fact, although voters may be aware of special-interest lobbying efforts, this may merely select for policies which are even harder to evaluate by the general public, rather than improving their overall efficiency. Even if the public were able to evaluate policy proposals effectively, they would find it infeasible to engage in collective action in order to defend their diffuse interest. Therefore, theorists expect that numerous special interests will be able to successfully lobby for various inefficient policies. In public choice theory, such scenarios of inefficient government policies are referred to as government failure  – a term akin to market failure from earlier theoretical welfare economics.

Rent-seeking
A field that is closely related to public choice is the study of rent-seeking. This field combines the study of a market economy with that of government. Thus, one might regard it as a new political economy. Its basic thesis is that when both a market economy and government are present, government agents may rent or sell their influence (i.e. a vote) to those who are seeking input into the lawmaking process. The government agent stands to benefit from support from the party seeking influence, while the party seeks to gain benefit through having public policy implemented that benefits them. This essentially results in a capture and reallocation of benefit, wasting the benefit and any resources used from being put to a productive use in society. This is due to the fact that the party attempting to acquire the benefit will spend up to or more than the benefit accrued, resulting in a zero-sum gain, or a negative sum gain. The real gain is the gain over the competition. This political action will then be used to keep competition out of the market due to a lack of real or political capital.

Rent-seeking is broader than public choice in that it applies to autocracies as well as democracies and, therefore, is not directly concerned with collective decision making. However, the obvious pressures it exerts on legislators, executives, bureaucrats, and even judges are factors that public choice theory must account for in its analysis of collective decision-making rules and institutions. Moreover, the members of a collective who are planning a government would be wise to take prospective rent-seeking into account.

Another major claim is that much of political activity is a form of rent-seeking which wastes resources. Gordon Tullock, Jagdish Bhagwati, and Anne Osborn Krueger have argued that rent-seeking has caused considerable waste.

Political stance
From such results it is sometimes asserted that public choice theory has an anti-state tilt. But there is ideological diversity among public choice theorists. Mancur Olson for example was an advocate of a strong state and instead opposed political interest group lobbying. More generally, James Buchanan has suggested that public choice theory be interpreted as "politics without romance", a critical approach to a pervasive earlier notion of idealized politics set against market failure.

The British journalist, Alistair Cooke, commenting on the Nobel Memorial Prize awarded to James M. Buchanan in 1986, reportedly summarized the public choice view of politicians by saying, "Public choice embodies the homely but important truth that politicians are, after all, no less selfish than the rest of us."

Recognition
Several notable public choice scholars have been awarded the Nobel Prize in Economics, including Kenneth Arrow (1972), James M. Buchanan (1986), George Stigler (1982), Gary Becker (1992), Amartya Sen (1998), Vernon Smith (2002) and Elinor Ostrom (2009). In addition, James Buchanan, Vernon Smith, and Elinor Ostrom were former presidents of the Public Choice Society.

Limitations and critiques

Buchanan and Tullock themselves outline methodological qualifications of the approach developed in their work The Calculus of Consent (1962), p. 30:
[E]ven if the model [with its rational self-interest assumptions] proves to be useful in explaining an important element of politics, it does not imply that all individuals act in accordance with the behavioral assumption made or that any one individual acts in this way at all times ... the theory of collective choice can explain only some undetermined fraction of collective action. However, so long as some part of all individual behavior ... is, in fact, motivated by utility maximization, and so long as the identification of the individual with the group does not extend to the point of making all individual utility functions identical, an economic-individualist model of political activity should be of some positive worth.

Further, Steven Pressman (economist) offers a critique of the public choice approach, arguing that public choice actually fails to explain political behavior in a number of central areas including politicians’ behavior as well as voting behavior. In the case of politicians' behavior, the public choice assumption that a politician's utility function is driven by greater political and economic power cannot account for various political phenomena. These include: why politicians vote against their constituents' interests, why they would advocate for higher taxation, fewer benefits, and smaller government, or why wealthy individuals would seek office.

As for critiques concerning voter behavior, it is argued that public choice is unable to explain why people vote due to limitations in rational choice theory. For example, from the viewpoint of rational choice theory, the expected gains of voting depend on (1) the benefit to the individual if their candidate wins, and (2) the probability that the individual's vote will determine the election's outcome. However, even in a tight election the probability that an individual's vote makes the difference is estimated to be effectively zero. This would suggest that even if an individual expects gains from their candidate's success, the expected gains from voting would also logically be near zero. When this is considered in combination with the multiple recognized costs of voting such as the opportunity cost of foregone wages, transportation costs, and more, the self-interested individual is, therefore, unlikely to vote at all (at least theoretically). Pressman is not alone in his critique, other prominent public choice economists also recognize that theorizing voting behavior is a major issue for the public choice approach. This includes critiques by Anthony Downs in An Economic Theory of Democracy, Morris P. Fiorina, and Gordon Tullock.

See also

References

Bibliography
 Arrow, Kenneth J. (1951, 2nd ed., 1963). Social Choice and Individual Values
 Black, Duncan (1958). The Theory of Committees and Elections. Cambridge: Cambridge University Press.
 Buchanan, James M. (1967). Public Finance in Democratic Process: Fiscal Institutions and Individual Choice, UNC Press. Description , scrollable preview, back cover
 _ (1968). The Demand and Supply of Public Goods. Rand McNally.
 _ (1986). "The Constitution of Economic Policy, Nobel Prize lecture. Republished in 1987,  American Economic Review, 77(3), pp.  243–250. 
 _ (2003). "Public Choice: The Origins and Development of a Research Program," Center for Study of Public Choice at George Mason University, Fairfax: Virginia.
 _, and Gordon Tullock (1962). The Calculus of Consent. Ann Arbor: University of Michigan Press.
 Buchanan, James M. and Richard A. Musgrave (1999). Public Finance and Public Choice: Two Contrasting Visions of the State, MIT Press. Description and scrollable preview links.
 Downs, Anthony. (1957). An Economic Theory of Democracy. Cambridge: York: Cambridge University Press.
 Hansjürgens, Bernd – The influence of Knut Wicksell on Richard Musgrave and James Buchanan
 Holcombe, R. G. (1989). "The Median Voter Model in Public Choice Theory", Public Choice 61, 115–125
 McKelvey, R. D. (1976). "Intransitivities in Multi Dimensional Voting Models and some Implications for Agenda Control", Journal of Economic Theory 12(3) 472–482
 MacKenzie, D. W. (2008). The Use of Knowledge about Society. Journal of Economic Behavior and Organization.
 _ (2008). Politics and Knowledge: Expectations formation in Democracy. Working paper, Presented at the Southern Economics Association Conference in 2005.
 Mueller, Dennis C. (1976). "Public Choice: A Survey," Journal of Economic Literature, 14(2), pp. 395–433.
 _ (2003). Public Choice III. Cambridge: Cambridge University Press. Description and preview.
 Niskanen, William A. (1987). "Bureaucracy." In Charles K. Rowley, ed. Democracy and Public Choice. Oxford: Basil Blackwell.
 Olson, Mancur, Jr. (1965, 2nd ed., 1971). The Logic of Collective Action. Cambridge: Harvard University Press. Description and chapter-previews links, pp.  ix– x.
 Ostrom, Elinor (1990). Governing the Commons The Evolution of Institutions for Collective Action. Cambridge University Press. Description and preview links. .
 _ (2010). "Beyond Markets and States: Polycentric Governance of Complex Economic Systems," American Economic Review, 100(3), pp. 641–672.
 Ostrom, Vincent (1986). The Theory of the Compound Republic. Lincoln, Nebraska: University of Nebraska Press. Second edition.
 Palda, Filip (2016). A Better Kind of Violence: The Chicago School of Political Economy, Public Choice, and The Quest for an Ultimate Theory of Power. Cooper-Wolfling Press.
 Riker, William H. (1962). The Theory of Political Coalitions. New Haven and London: Yale University Press.
 Romer, T. & Rosenthal, H. (1979). "The Elusive Median Voter", Journal of Public Economics 12(2) 143–170
 Rowley, Charles K., and Friedrich Schneider, ed. (2004). The Encyclopedia of Public Choice, 2 v. Springer. Description, v. 1, chapter abstract and preview  links, and review 
 _ and _, eds. (2008). Readings in Public Choice and Constitutional Political Economy, Springer. Description and chapter-preview links.
 _ and Laura Razzolini, eds. (2001). The Elgar Companion to Public Choice. Northampton, Mass.: Edward Elgar,  Description.
 Wicksell, Knut ([1896] 1958). "A New Principle of Just Taxation," trans. J.M. Buchanan, in Richard A. Musgrave and Alan T. Peacock, ed., Classics in the Theory of Public Finance'',  Palgrave Macmillan.

Further reading
 
 
 

Public economics
Political science theories